Ilse Suzanne van der Meijden (born 22 October 1988 in Baarn) is a water polo player of the Netherlands who represents the Dutch national team in international competitions.

Van der Meijden was part of the team that became fifth at the 2006 FINA Women's Water Polo World League in Cosenza. With her in the team they also became fifth at the 2006 Women's European Water Polo Championship in Belgrade, followed by the 9th spot at the 2007 World Aquatics Championships in Melbourne. The Dutch team finished in fifth place at the 2008 Women's European Water Polo Championship in Málaga and they qualified for the 2008 Summer Olympics in Beijing. There they ended up winning the gold medal on 21 August, beating the United States 9-8 in the final.

Due to her injuries, only a few weeks before 2012 Women's European Water Polo Championship had Van der Meijden back in training. During the Championship in Eindhoven, the team came no further than sixth place.

After the 2013-2014 season, Van der Meijden became a coach of HZC De Robben and BZC Brandenburg.

See also
 Netherlands women's Olympic water polo team records and statistics
 List of Olympic champions in women's water polo
 List of Olympic medalists in water polo (women)
 List of women's Olympic water polo tournament goalkeepers
 List of World Aquatics Championships medalists in water polo

References

External links
 
 personal website 

1988 births
Living people
People from Baarn
Dutch female water polo players
Water polo goalkeepers
Water polo players at the 2008 Summer Olympics
Medalists at the 2008 Summer Olympics
Olympic gold medalists for the Netherlands in water polo
Sportspeople from Utrecht (province)
20th-century Dutch women
21st-century Dutch women
Dutch water polo coaches